Joel Dias Barcellos (27 November 1936 – 10 November 2018) was a Brazilian actor. He appeared in more than 50 films and television shows between 1955 and 1997. He starred in the 1974 film Sagarana: The Duel, which was entered into the 24th Berlin International Film Festival. In 2012 it was reported that he died while swimming, but this later turned out to be false. He later died of a stroke on 10 November 2018, aged 81.

Selected filmography
 Os Fuzis (1964)
 My Home Is Copacabana (1965)
 Sagarana: The Duel (1974)
 Luz del Fuego (1982)

References

External links

1936 births
2018 deaths
Brazilian male film actors